Oreta roepkei is a moth in the family Drepanidae. It was described by Watson in 1961. It is found in Java, Indonesia.

The wingspan is 42.4–49.4 mm for males and 50–53 mm for females. There are two male forms. One is yellow and brown while the other is brown. Females are intermediate between the two male forms.

References

Moths described in 1961
Drepaninae